The FoolProof Initiative is a project by the FoolProof Foundation that teaches consumer life skills and healthy skepticism to consumers. It teaches consumers to question anyone who wants to impact their money or welfare. Its resources are generally listed under 
financial literacy resources.

FoolProof was founded by Walter Cronkite and a group of young people. It provides free, advertising-fee, and comprehensive consumer life skills curriculums for middle and high schools, as well as a consumer newspaper.

The peer-to-peer curriculums use video and audio, games and music in a modular system to teach critical thinking skills and habits that can travel with a consumer through life. It also includes complex as well as basic financial concepts such as understanding credit (finance) and credit score, getting a checking account or savings account, and knowing how to use credit cards.

The Initiative, for instance, appears to be one of the most effective in reaching vulnerable young people with meaningful education, rather than programs sponsored by business.

Its motto is "Use Caution. Question Sellers. Rely on Research."

Characteristics

FoolProof is a program designed by young people from across the world to help educate students about financial decisions in a friendly video format using real-life stories. The best part is that FoolProof can be used for free by anyone, no matter their financial aptitude, to help (young) people learn about money and the power of healthy skepticism.

Young people generally make common mistakes when it comes to their money. The FoolProof Initiative addresses these problems.

Here is a list of the most common mistakes:

 I impulse buy and don't practice healthy skepticism.
 I don’t have to worry about credit (finance) yet.
 News is news, whatever the platform or source.
 I believe advertising generally tells me all I need to know about a product or service.
 Bad credit can’t keep me from getting a job.
 All loan companies have the same rates.
 Posting sensitive and personal information online is okay.
 All credit cards are alike.
 It’s OK to bounce a few checks.
 It’s OK to make minimum payments on a credit card.
 Paying late occasionally can’t hurt my credit.
 Fine print isn’t important.
 Young people don’t have a credit score.

Curriculum 
Available are a variety of educational programs/curriculums that are tied to state financial literacy standards and guidelines, listed in every state by the United States Department of Education. FoolProof also teaches financial literacy topics required by the Council of Economic Education.  All programs are available to any consumer for free.

References

External links
 FoolProof Initiative Consumer Website
 FoolProof Foundation Website
 Consumer Federation of America Website
 National Association for Consumer Advocates Website
 Campaign for a Commercial-Free Childhood Website
 CARE (Credit Abuse Resistance Education) For Your Future Website

Personal finance education